The Scottish Alternative Music Awards (SAMAs) is an annual music award based in Glasgow, Scotland. The SAMAs present awards in seven categories to the best emerging artists in Scotland.

History 

The SAMAs were founded in 2009 by music entrepreneur Richy Muirhead, initially as a university project. The project grew to become the awards that exist today, with the first SAMAs being held in 2010 at The Classic Grand, Glasgow. In subsequent years the awards have been hosted at The Garage, Glasgow.

The SAMAs have grown year on year to become a must on the Scottish music calendar drawing support from the likes of broadcaster Vic Galloway, DJ Jim Gellatly, and various artists and sponsors.

The awards have helped develop the careers of Fatherson (Best Rock/Alternative, SAMA 2012), Hector Bizerk (Best Hip-Hop, SAMA 2014), and Model Aeroplanes (Best Newcomer, SAMA 2014).

Past winners

References

External links 
 

Scottish music
Scottish awards
British music awards
2010 establishments in Scotland
Awards established in 2010
Annual events in the United Kingdom
21st-century awards